= Early Christian Women and Pagan Opinion =

1996 book by Margaret Y. MacDonald

Early Christian Women and Pagan Opinion: The Power of the Hysterical Woman
- Author: Margaret Y. MacDonald
- Language: English
- Genre: Non-fiction
- Publisher: Cambridge University Press
- Publication date: 1996
- ISBN: 9780521567282

Early Christian Women and Pagan Opinion: The Power of the Hysterical Woman (1996) is a book written by Margaret Y. MacDonald.

== Topic ==
This book is a study of early Christianity and the role of Christian women in the first two centuries. MacDonald uses the findings of cultural anthropology and models of analysis taken from modern sociology to study extant texts of pagan and Christian public opinion in an attempt to provide insight into the hidden lives of women. New Testament professor Rollin Ramsaran says, "Religion scholars will take note of how MacDonald applies these perspectives... MacDonald mounts a thorough examination of the sticky issues at stake and then offers a credible and persuasive defense for her applied perspectives." Classics scholar A.M.Keith goes on to say "Her detailed discussion of the limits and possibilities of social-scientific models is extremely valuable and sets a new standard of methodological sophistication for scholars investigating the lives of women in Graeco-Roman antiquity."

== Structure ==
The book consists of three major components. Part 1 analyzes pagan comments and criticisms. Keith says MacDonald reconsiders ancient documents that are all well-known, yet MacDonald's approach uncovers new possibilities. MacDonald uses the empire's social expectations of women in terms of "honor" and "shame," "public" and "private" and "informal power" verses "formal authority" to argue much of the vociferous pagan criticism of the early church was linked to early Christian "female initiative" which the empire saw as akin to sorcery. This negative pagan reaction showed women did in fact play a significant role in Christianity's beginnings. Accusations concerning women were among those used to influence public opinion about Christianity itself demonstrating its threat to the pagan social order.

MacDonald explains "The [pagan critic's] focus on women draws attention to the essence of a group where power is exercised in dangerous, illegitimate ways, where the norms of the [Roman] household order are subverted, where traditional male control of house and school is compromised, where the public practices of religion are ignored in favor of a god who is worshipped in private, and where the only wisdom comes from magic lore."

Academic theologian Peter Richardson explains MacDonald is a recognized Pauline scholar, and in the second section of the book, she accordingly turns her analysis to the Pauline literature. New Testament texts which most limit female activity are in the Pauline epistles, and according to classics scholar Constance McLeese these texts were likely prompted by a "concern for the Church’s public image" that resulted from pagan criticism and negative public opinion. MacDonald emphasizes negative public opinion in the Roman empire produced violence and impacted the church's ability to "evangelize". McLeese says MacDonald concludes early Christian women must have been acting as "proselytizers in their roles as wife, mother and household slaves."

When looked at from this perspective some of the Pauline comments upon marriage can be interpreted as being highly subversive. For example, the counsel provided to women married to non-believers in I Cor. 7:12–16 and 1 Pet. 3:1–6, far from enforcing the [Roman] status quo, advises a radical course of action which is at direct odds with the ideal wife of the Greco-Roman household."

The third and concluding section of the work is an analysis of the interrelationship between second century Christian comments on marriage and the development of marriage as a metaphor used within the Christian church. MacDonald suggests that "the link between the roles played by married Christian woman and this choice of symbolic language is far more ...affirmative of women than modern theories of patriarchy would allow."

MacDonald concludes that, even though it is accurate to say second century Christian women did not possess authority in the traditional Roman sense, they may still have possessed more informal power than is generally recognized in traditional feminist scholarship.

== Reception ==
Reception of MacDonald's book has been positive. New Testament scholar Constance E. McLeese calls it "thought provoking" and a "remarkable book"; Stephen Benko refers to it as "a serious historical-exegetical study". Professor Rollin Ramsaran writes, "This is a well written, judiciously documented, and ambitious look at the role of women in early Christianity." Classics Professor Allison M. Keith says it is "sensitively written and subtly argued."
